Bigg Boss 15, also known as Bigg Boss: "Sankat in Jungle" or Bigg Boss: Pan Pana Pan Pandrah was the fifteenth season of the Indian reality TV series Bigg Boss. It premiered on 2 October 2021 on Colors TV Salman Khan hosted the season for the twelve time. and the grand finale aired on 30 January 2022 where Tejasswi Prakash emerged as the winner and Karan Kundra emerged as the runner-up. The season marked a series of disappointments for the franchise and the show recorded the lowest TRP of just 0.8.

Production

Teaser
The first teaser was released on 22 August 2021, in which Salman Khan is a forest officer talking to a wishful talking tree named Vishwasuntree in which veteran actress Rekha gave her voice. On the Grand Finale of Bigg Boss OTT, another promo was released revealing the date of the premiere .

Eye logo
This theme of the season was "Sankat In Jungle". The eye this time was covered with green grass and shows a tree in the pupil of the eye with flames coming from the centre of the eye.

House
The house this time had a "Jungle Theme" and was located in Goregaon for the third time. The house was divided into 2 parts, Jungle House and Main House. On Day 21, Jungle House was closed.

Telecast 
Apart from the usual hour-long episode, viewers also had access to the direct 24x7 camera footage. The
viewers also had access to Before TV on Voot Select where the episode was telecast 30 minutes before it was telecasted on Colors TV. Also for the first time, Live Voting was conducted for the Eviction Process. On weekdays, the show was at 10.30 PM IST & weekend show was at 9.30 PM IST which was changed to 8 PM IST from Week 16.

Concept
All housemates will be given a survival kit with a few essentials throughout the season and will get fewer facilities this time. The housemates will enter a small jungle house which has a small kitchen, no beds and sofa and bathroom for the first 3 weeks. The housemates who will survive the jungle will enter the main luxurious house. There is a wishful tree in the garden area named Vishwasuntree who is the queen of the magical jungle in the house and will give advantages and privileges to the contestants who perform well in the jungle. On Day 36, Salman announced that there will be a new zone named VIP Zone. The members who are in VIP Zone are eligible to be in the finale.

Housemates status

Housemates
The participants in the order of appearance and entered in the house are:

Original entrants
Jay Bhanushali – Actor and television presenter. He is Known for playing Neev Shergill in Kayamath. He made his film debut with Hate Story 2. He was the anchor of many reality shows like Dance India Dance, Sa Re Ga Ma Pa, The Voice India Kids and Superstar Singer. He was the winner of Nach Baliye 5 along with wife Mahhi Vij. He participated in Fear Factor: Khatron Ke Khiladi 7 as a contestant.
Vishal Kotian –  Television actor. known for playing Birbal in Har Mushkil Ka Hal Akbar Birbal and Akbar Ka Bal Birbal.
Tejasswi Prakash – Television actress. She is known for playing Ragini Maheshwari in Swaragini - Jodein Rishton Ke Sur, Diya Singh in Rishta Likhenge Hum Naya, Mishti in Silsila Badalte Rishton Ka and Participated in Fear Factor: Khatron Ke Khiladi 10.
Vidhi Pandya  –  Television actress. Known for playing Imli Rajvanshi in Udaan, Suman Tiwari in Ek Duje Ke Vaaste 2.
Simba Nagpal – Television actor and model. He is Known for playing Virat Singh in Shakti - Astitva Ke Ehsaas Ki. He was also Participated in reality shows like MTV Roadies and MTV Splitsvilla.
Umar Riaz –  Surgeon turned into model and actor. He is the elder brother of Bigg Boss 13's 1st runner up model and actor Asim Riaz.
Ieshaan Sehgal – Television personality.
Donal Bisht – Television actress and model. Known for playing Sharanya in Ek Deewaana Tha and Ishika Patel in Roop - Mard Ka Naya Swaroop. 
Akasa Singh –  Singer. She is most remembered for her song "Naagin", a duet with Aastha Gill.
Karan Kundrra –  Television actor and model. He is known for playing Arjun Punj in Kitani Mohabbat Hai, Ritwik Noon in Dil Hi Toh Hai and Ranveer Chauhan in Yeh Rishta Kya Kehlata Hai. He also hosted shows like Gumrah End Of Innocence and MTV Love School. He was a gangleader in MTV Roadies.
Afsana Khan – Indian Punjabi playback singer, actress and songwriter, Participated in Voice of Punjab 3 and Rising Star Season 1. Known for singing  track Titliaan.
Miesha Iyer –  Reality television personality. She participated in MTV Splitsvilla and was also seen in the first season of MTV Ace of Space.
Sahil Shroff –  Actor and model who featured in the Don 2: The King Is Back, He also featured in the film Shaadi Ke Side Effects.

OTTians
Pratik Sehajpal –  Reality television actor. He participated in reality shows like MTV Love School and Ace of Space 1. He was the 4th runner up of Bigg Boss OTT.
Shamita Shetty –  Film actress. Known for debut film Mohabbatein. She also participated in Bigg Boss 3. She was the 2nd runner up of Bigg Boss OTT and 3rd runner-up of Khatron Ke Khiladi 9
Nishant Bhatt –  Choreographer. He was a part of dance reality shows like Super Dancer, Jhalak Dikhhla Jaa and Dance Deewane. He was the 1st runner up of Bigg Boss OTT.

Wildcard entrants
Rajiv Adatia- Former model and entrepreneur.
Ritesh Kumar- Businessman, software professional; Rakhi Sawant's husband.
Abhijit Bichukale- Politician; participated in Bigg Boss Marathi 2
Raqesh Bapat- Television and film actor. He is known for acting in films like Tum Bin, Dil Vil Pyar Vyar and Heroine. He has also worked in Popular television shows like Maryada: Lekin Kab Tak? and Qubool Hai. He participated in Bigg Boss OTT and became the 3rd runner up
Neha Bhasin- Singer. She participated in Bigg Boss OTT and was evicted on Day 39. She is known for her song Dhunki, Jag ghoomeya and Bajre da sitta.
Devoleena Bhattacharjee - Television actress. She is known for her role of Gopi Modi in Saath Nibhaana Saathiya. She participated in reality shows like Dance India Dance and Box Cricket League. She participated in Bigg Boss 13 but left the house on Day 63 due to health issues and She also participated in Bigg Boss 14 as Eijaz Khan's proxy from Day 106 and was evicted on Day 134. 
Rashami Desai - Television actress. She is known for playing the roles of Tapasya in Uttaran and Shorvari in Dil Se Dil Tak. She also featured in films like Dabangg 2 and reality shows Jhalak Dikhhla Jaa, Fear Factor: Khatron Ke Khiladi and Nach Baliye. She was the 3rd runner up of Bigg Boss 13.
Rakhi Sawant- Actress and dancer. She was a contestant of Season 1 and was evicted on Day 84 ending in the 4th position. She entered the Bigg Boss 14 House on Day 70 as a challenger and was the 4th runner up.

Weekly summary

Guest appearances

Housemates Allotment

 The finalist of Bigg Boss OTT get direct access to Main House. 
 By winning 'Zeher Ka Keher' Task, Team Tiger Jay, Vishal, Tejasswi and Akasa were upgraded to the Main house. 
 Due to violation of the rules, All Main House members were downgraded to the Jungle House.
 By winning 'The Currency' Task, Karan & Tejasswi, Shamita & Vishal, Umar & Afsana and Sanchalak Nishant were upgraded to Main House. 
 The last five jungle housemates had to come to a mutual decision of leaving the show or giving up the remaining 25 lakh prize money to stay and get access to Main House, They choose the latter and BB Magical Jungle started disappearing with all housemates in the Main House. 
 House Captain Umar get to choose 3 more VIP contestants.
 By winning the 'BB Mine' Task, Vishal is now VIP Contestant. 
 By winning the 'Scary Monster' Task, Nishant had got a special power that he could upgrade 2 Common Members to VIPs and downgrade 2 VIPs to Common Members, He upgraded Simba and Pratik and downgraded Tejasswi and Karan.
 Due to violation of rules Bigg Boss announced that VIP Zone will be temporarily closed and all became Common Housemates.
 The challengers entered as VIPs.
 Rakhi wins the 'Ticket to Finale' Task and becomes the sole VIP housemate with others downgraded. 
 By surviving via public vote Rashmi won 'Ticket To Finale'.

Nominations table 

Color Key
  indicates the House Captain.
  indicates VIP Member.
  indicates that the Housemate was directly nominated for eviction prior and during regular nominations process.
  indicates that the housemate has Re-Entered.
  indicates that the Housemate was granted immunity from nominations.
  indicates the Housemate was ejected
  indicates the contestant has walked out of the show.
  indicates the contestant has been evicted by housemates.
  indicates the contestant has been evicted.

Notes
 : Donal and Ieshaan were given a condition to return to the Bigg Boss Jungle, the condition was one of them should be nominated in this week, Ieshaan was nominated in a mutual decision.
 : Bigg Boss nominated all housemates in the BB Jungle, for Pratik's behaviour and for damaging the Bigg Boss property.
 : The main house members are safe from nominations.
 : As a punishment for not following the house rules, all housemates had to mutually decide to evict two housemates immediately from the house.
 : Captain Nishant had to nominate 8 housemates. Those 8 housemates took part in a Room of illusions Task to get a chance to save themselves.
 : No Captain during this week's nominations.
 : 4 celebrities entered the house for nominations and had the power to save one housemate each. Rashami Desai saved Vishal, Gautam Gulati saved Tejasswi, Devoleena saved Jay, Kamya saved Karan.
 : Karan, Tejasswi, Jay and Vishal had the power to nominate one housemate directly for eviction. They nominated Miesha.
 : Raqesh left the house due to a poor health condition
 : Afsana was ejected from the house due to harming herself with a knife
 : VIP Members are safe from Nominations
 : Shamita left the house due to health issues
 : After Nishant won the task, He got a special power to replace 2 VIPs with 2 Non VIPs, They replaced Karan and Tejasswi with Simba and Pratik.
 : All 5 Safe Housemates Have to save 1 bottom housemate each from getting Evicted, Since No one saved Simba, He was evicted
 : The Voting Lines were opened for the Bottom 5 for Live Task, Out of 5, Jay, Vishal and Neha received the Least Votes and were evicted
 : The Top 5 finalists were offered ₹10 lakhs but to obtain the sum of money, they had to walk out of the show. Nishant agreed and thus walked out with the money.

References

External links 
 Official website

15
2021 Indian television seasons
2022 Indian television seasons